
Year 374 (CCCLXXIV) was a common year starting on Wednesday (link will display the full calendar) of the Julian calendar. At the time, it was known as the Year of the Consulship of Augustus and Equitius (or, less frequently, year 1127 Ab urbe condita). The denomination 374 for this year has been used since the early medieval period, when the Anno Domini calendar era became the prevalent method in Europe for naming years.

Events 
 By place 
 Roman Empire 
 The Quadi cross the Danube and begin ravaging Pannonia. They avoid the fortified cities, and plunder the unprotected countryside.

 Mesoamerica 
 May 4 – Spearthrower Owl ascends to the throne and becomes ruler of Teotihuacan (Mexico).

 By topic 
 Religion 
 December 7 – The people of Milan astonish Ambrosius, governor of Aemilia-Liguria, by acclaiming him bishop. He is the second son of the former praetorian prefect of Gaul, and becomes a creative thinker whose ideas will provide the paradigm for medieval church-state relations.

Births 
 Fu Liang (or Jiyou), Chinese official and politician (d. 426)
 Gwanggaeto the Great, Korean king of Goguryeo (d. 413)

Deaths 
 January 2 –  Gregory the Elder, Christian bishop and saint (b. 276)
 April 20 – Marcellinus of Gaul (or Marcellin), Christian bishop
 November 17 – Pap of Armenia (or Papas), king of Armenia
 Auxentius of Milan, Christian bishop and theologian
 Marcellus of Ancyra, Christian bishop and saint
 Pushyavarman, Indian ruler of Kamarupa

References